Vikram Singh is an Indian politician from Fatehpur, Uttar Pradesh, affiliated with Bhartiya Janata Party. He is member of Uttar Pradesh Legislative Assembly, won election in 2014.

See also

 Fatehpur (Lok Sabha constituency)

References

People from Fatehpur district
Living people
Uttar Pradesh MLAs 2017–2022
Bharatiya Janata Party politicians from Uttar Pradesh
1967 births